Strange Lady in Town is a 1955 American Western film directed by Mervyn LeRoy and starring Greer Garson. She plays a doctor who plans to introduce modern techniques of medicine to old Santa Fe in 1880, but is opposed by an established doctor played by Dana Andrews.

Plot
1880: Dr. Julia Garth, traveling from Boston, arrives near Santa Fe, New Mexico, where her brother David is a U.S. Cavalry lieutenant. She soon meets the town's respected physician, Dr. Rourke O'Brien, as well as Father Gabriel Mendoza, who has helped establish a new hospital.

Spurs O'Brien, the tomboy niece of the doctor, has a crush on David. She helps Julia buy a horse and teaches her to ride. Julia begins seeing patients, including a boy having vision problems and a toothache sufferer Billy the Kid has brought to her, but encounters resistance from Dr. O'Brien, who doesn't believe women should be practicing medicine.

David shoots a man who accuses him of cheating at cards, pleading self-defense. Dr. O'Brien can't help but admire and be attracted to Julia, but she declines his marriage proposal, citing prejudices like his toward women as the reason she left Boston in the first place. He is irritated again when Julia gives medical advice to his most distinguished patient, New Mexico's governor, General Lew Wallace.

At a party, David strikes an Army captain who accuses him of cheating and rustling. David admits to Julia that the charges are true, then robs a bank and rides off. Julia and Spurs manage to talk David into surrendering, whereupon he is shot. Julia is pressured to leave town by some townspeople until Dr. O'Brien speaks up on her behalf and proposes, to which she accepts.

Cast
 Greer Garson as Dr. Julia Garth
 Dana Andrews as Dr. Rourke O'Brien
 Cameron Mitchell as Lt. David Garth
 Lois Smith as Spurs
 Walter Hampden as Father Gabriel
 Pedro Gonzalez Gonzalez as Trooper Martinez-Martinez
 John Stephenson as Capt. Taggart
 Adele Jergens as Bella
 Gregory Walcott as Scanlon
 Ralph Moody as Gov. Lew Wallace
 Nick Adams as Billy the Kid
 Paul Wexler as Townsman

Production

Filming
It was filmed at Old Tucson Studios, Tucson, Arizona.

See also
 List of American Western films of 1955]]

References

External list
 
 
 
 

1955 films
Films scored by Dimitri Tiomkin
Films directed by Mervyn LeRoy
1955 Western (genre) films
Films set in New Mexico
CinemaScope films
American Western (genre) films
Films shot in Tucson, Arizona
American historical films
1950s historical films
Films set in the 1880s
Warner Bros. films
1950s English-language films
1950s American films